Saint-Vallier is a commune in the Saône-et-Loire department in the region of Bourgogne-Franche-Comté in eastern France.

Geography
The Bourbince flows south through the western part of the commune.

Population

Personalities
Habib Baldé, footballer
Karim Robin, professional footballer
Guillaume Warmuz, footballer

See also
Communes of the Saône-et-Loire department

References

Communes of Saône-et-Loire